The women's time trial of the 2005 Junior Road World Championships cycling event took place on 12 August in Salzburg, Austria. The race was 14.00 km long and 44 cyclists participated in the race.

Final classification (top 10) 

Results from cyclingarchives.com

See also 

 2005 UCI Juniors Road World Championships – Women's road race
 2013 UCI Road World Championships – Women's junior time trial

References 

Junior Women's Road Race
Cycle races in Austria
UCI Road World Championships – Women's time trial
2005 in women's road cycling